Catocala persimilis is a moth of the family Erebidae first described by Warren in 1888. It is found in western India.

References

Moths described in 1888
persimilis
Moths of Asia